Vinyl propionate is the organic compound with the formula CH3CH2CO2CH=CH2.  This colorless liquid is the ester of propionic acid and vinyl alcohol.  It is used to produce poly(vinyl propionate) as well as copolymers with acrylate esters,
vinyl chloride, and vinyl acetate, some of which are used in paints.  The compound resembles vinyl acetate.  

Since vinyl alcohol is not available, vinyl propionate is produced by the addition of propionic acid to acetylene.  The reaction is catalyzed by carbon and zinc salts.

References

Monomers
Esters
Commodity chemicals
Vinyl esters